Mark A. Vermette (born October 3, 1967) is a Canadian former professional ice hockey player who played 67 games in the National Hockey League.  He played with the Quebec Nordiques.

Vermette was born in Cochenour, Ontario. He was a member of the Lake Superior State Lakers 1988 NCAA Championship men's ice hockey team. He scored the winning goal in overtime to give the Lakers the championship.

Career statistics

Awards and honours

References

External links 

1967 births
Living people
Canadian ice hockey right wingers
Halifax Citadels players
Ice hockey people from Ontario
Lake Superior State Lakers men's ice hockey players
Las Vegas Thunder players
People from Kenora District
Quebec Nordiques draft picks
Quebec Nordiques players
NCAA men's ice hockey national champions
AHCA Division I men's ice hockey All-Americans